Sybra dunni is a species of beetle in the family Cerambycidae. It was described by Breuning in 1976.

References

dunni
Beetles described in 1976